Stanley Roy Badmin (18 April 1906 – 28 April 1989) was an English painter and etcher particularly notable for his book illustrations and landscapes.

Life
Badmin was born in Sydenham in 1906 and baptized at a Methodist Chapel in Holcombe, Somerset, in 1908. He went on to study at Camberwell School of Arts and Crafts and the Royal College of Art, London; he became one of the youngest ever associate members of the Royal Watercolour Society at age 26. He taught at a number of art schools in London, teaching at the Central School of Art in the 1950s.

In October 1939, Badmin was living with his parents in Lewisham and was an art teacher. His father, Charles, was a retired schoolmaster. During the Second World War, he worked for the British government's Ministry of Information, before joining the Royal Air Force.

A major retrospective exhibition of his work was held in 1985 to coincide with the publication of his biography.

Badmin died in Chichester, West Sussex, in 1989.

Work

Badmin worked primarily in watercolour. He was particularly inspired by the English rural landscape, and was especially noted for his detailed yet evocative paintings of trees. His work shows strong affinities with contemporary neo-romantic artists such as Graham Sutherland, John Piper and Eric Ravilious. His greatest public recognition came through his book illustration and advertising work, which was also largely based on English landscape subjects.

During the 1930s, Badmin began to receive commissions for magazine illustration; he produced his first book illustrations in 1937 (Highways and Byways of Essex by Clifford Bax, with further illustrations by F. L. Griggs). He wrote and illustrated three books for Puffin, the children's imprint of Penguin Books, one of which (Trees in Britain, 1943) has been described as "one of the most beautiful illustrated books of [the 20th] century". The book was so successful it later became adopted as a set text by an agricultural college.

Some of Badmin's most well-known work was commissioned by Shell; he worked on advertising art and book illustration for the popular Shell Guides series during the 1950s. His style also became familiar to the British travelling public through his work for London Transport and a series of posters for British Railways, among other clients.

Badmin usually signed his work "S. R. Badmin", and is most widely known as such.

References

Sources

Beetles, C. S. R. Badmin and the English Landscape, Collins, 1985,  

1906 births
1989 deaths
20th-century English painters
English male painters
Landscape artists
English printmakers
People from Sydenham, London
British poster artists
English illustrators
English children's book illustrators
English watercolourists
Academics of the Central School of Art and Design
20th-century British printmakers
People from Chichester District
20th-century English male artists